1906 was the sixth year for the Detroit Tigers in the American League. The team finished in sixth place with a record of 71–78 (.477), 21 games behind the Chicago White Sox.

Regular season 
The 1906 Tigers were outscored by their opponents 599 to 518. The team's attendance at Bennett Park was 174,043, seventh out of the eight teams in the AL.

Season standings

Record vs. opponents

Notable transactions 
 August 1906: Jack Rowan was acquired by the Tigers from the Leavenworth Old Soldiers.

Roster

Player stats

Batting

Starters by position 
Note: Pos = Position; G = Games played; AB = At bats; H = Hits; Avg. = Batting average; HR = Home runs; RBI = Runs batted in

Other batters 
Note: G = Games played; AB = At bats; H = Hits; Avg. = Batting average; HR = Home runs; RBI = Runs batted in

Note: pitchers' batting statistics not included

Pitching

Starting pitchers 
Note: G = Games pitched; IP = Innings pitched; W = Wins; L = Losses; ERA = Earned run average; SO = Strikeouts

Other pitchers 
Note: G = Games pitched; IP = Innings pitched; W = Wins; L = Losses; ERA = Earned run average; SO = Strikeouts

Notes

References 

 1906 Detroit Tigers Regular Season Statistics at Baseball Reference

Detroit Tigers seasons
Detroit Tigers season
Detroit Tigers
1906 in Detroit